Sean O'Connor may refer to:

Seán O'Connor (businessman) (born 1960), Irish businessman and political activist
Sean O'Connor (comedian) (born 1985), American comedian and writer
Sean O'Connor (footballer) (born 1981), former English footballer mainly with Queen of the South
Sean O'Connor (ice hockey) (born 1981), Canadian professional ice hockey player
Seán O'Connor (Irish footballer) (born 1983), former Irish footballer
Seán O'Connor (hurler) (born 1981), Irish hurler
Sean O'Connor (producer) (born 1968), British producer, writer and director
Seán O'Connor (rugby union) (born 1996), Irish rugby union player
Sean O'Connor (soccer) (born 1984), American soccer player
Seán O'Connor (wrestler) (born 1937), Irish Olympic wrestler

See also
Sean Connor (born 1967), footballer